Shin Bo-ra (born April 30, 1993), previously known by her stage name Hana, is a South Korean singer, songwriter and actress. She is also a former member and leader of Gugudan. Following the group's disbandment, she is currently active as an actress.

Early life
Shin was born on April 30, 1993, in  Bucheon, Gyeonggi Province, South Korea. She graduated from Seokyeong University.

Career

Pre-debut
Shin made a cameo in  High School King of Savvy as a high school girl in 2014 before her debut with Gugudan.

2016–present: Gugudan and acting debut

Shin was revealed as a member of Jellyfish Entertainment's upcoming girl group on June 14, 2016. On June 22, it was confirmed that Gugudan were making their debut with a "mermaid" concept. The highlight medley of the group's debut mini-album was released on June 24. Shin debuted with Gugudan on June 28, 2016, with the mini-album, Act. 1 The Little Mermaid, with "Wonderland" as the title song. Shin made a cameo in  Children of the 20th Century in 2017. She participated in the soundtrack for the OCN television series My First Love with the track "Throbbing Weather".

Shin played her first main role in My Fuxxxxx Romance as Ahn Ji-young and as Shin Na-ra in Another Peaceful Day of Second-Hand Items both in 2020. Shin played alongside Go Geon-han in Save Me Oldie in 2021.

She left Jellyfish Entertainment after her contract expired on April 30, 2021.

In August 2021, it was announced that Shin has signed a contract with FN Entertainment and will be going by her birth name, Shin Bo-ra.

Discography

Soundtrack appearances

Filmography

Film

Television series

Web series

References

External links

 

1993 births
Living people
People from Bucheon
Jellyfish Entertainment artists
South Korean female idols
South Korean women pop singers
South Korean television actresses
South Korean web series actresses
Gugudan
21st-century South Korean women singers
21st-century South Korean singers
21st-century South Korean actresses